The Rivetinidae are a family of praying mantids, based on the type genus Rivetina.  As part of a major revision of mantid taxonomy, this family contains many genera moved from Miomantinae: tribe Rivetinini; some genera previously placed there have now been moved to the new families Deroplatyidae and Chroicopteridae.  The new placement of this taxon is in the superfamily Eremiaphiloidea (of group Cernomantodea) and infraorder Schizomantodea.

Distribution
Genera in this family have been recorded from: southern Europe, Africa and Asia.  The species of this family present in Italy are Geomantis larvoides and Rivetina baetica.

Subfamilies, Tribes and Genera  
The Mantodea Species File lists two subfamilies:

Deiphobinae 
tribe Cotigaonopsini
 Cotigaonopsis Vyjayandi, 2009 – monotypic C. providenceae Vyjayandi, 2009
tribe Deiphobini
 Deiphobe Stal, 1877
 Deiphobella Giglio-Tos, 1916
 Indothespis Werner, 1935

Rivetininae 

tribe Ischnomantini 
 Eremoplana Stal, 1871
 Ischnomantis Stal, 1871
tribe Rivetinini
 Bolivaria Stal, 1877
 Geomantis Pantel, 1896
 Microthespis Werner, 1908
 Pararivetina Beier, 1930
 Rivetina Berland & Chopard, 1922
 Rivetinula La Greca, 1977
 Teddia Burr, 1899

References

External links 

Mantodea families
Mantodea of Europe